Logue is a family name derived from the Irish Ó Maolmhuaidh, anglicized to Ó Laoghog and Mulvogue. Principally from County Londonderry and County Donegal.

Notable persons with the surname include:

Alexandra W. Logue, American academic and behavioral scientist
Alison Logue, Australian soccer player for  2009 Newcastle Jets
Amanda Logue, subject of 2013 Snapped: Killer Couples episode
Antonia Logue, Irish novelist
Bob Logue, Calgary Stampede Rodeo Bareback champion 1992
Brenda Logue, victim of 1998 Omagh bombing
Cailie Logue, American collegiate 10K runner
Calvin Logue, signer of the 1861 Georgia Ordinance of Secession
Charles Logue (1858-1919), Irish-American builder
Charles A. Logue (1889–1938), American screenwriter
Charles T. Logue (1922-2000), American politician
Charlie Logue, member of Irish folk rock band Goats Don't Shave
Christian Logue, member of American metal band Savage Grace
Christopher Logue (1926–2011), English poet
Chuck Logue, Calgary Stampede Rodeo Bareback champion 2001
Courtland L. Logue, Jr., American businessman, founder of EZCorp
Dale Logue, contestant involved in The Big Surprise quiz show scandal
Dan Logue, (1950–2021), American politician
Dave Logue, American actor in The Junkman
David Logue, Northern Irish 3000m steeplechase runner
Deirdre Logue (born 1964), Canadian video artist and arts administrator, sister of Donal Logue
Donal Logue (born 1965), Irish-Canadian actor
Edward Logue (1813–1865), founder of Kent Town Brewery, South Australia, grandfather of Lionel Logue
Edward J. Logue (1921–2000), American urban planner and public administrator
Eli Logue, stuntwoman in Avengers: Endgame and other films
Elizabeth Logue, American actress in New Faces of 1952
Elizabeth Malamalamaokalani Logue, Hawaiian-Chinese-English model in opening title sequence of Hawaii Five-O
Florence Logue Koontz, mother of author Dean Koontz
Frank Logue (1924–2010), mayor of New Haven, Connecticut 1976-1979
Frank S. Logue (born 1963), American clergyman
Gerard Logue, Northern Irishman killed in 1985 in Belfast by UK law enforcement officers
Griffin Logue (born 1998), Australian rules footballer
Hazel Logue Treweek (1920–2006), Australian academic, teacher and Shakespearean scholar
Hugh Logue (born 1949), Northern Irish politician and economist
Jake Logue (born 1972), American football player
James Logue (born 1939), American ice hockey goaltender
James Logue (born 1989), Irish hurler
James Logue, Scottish politician
James Logue, mayor of Harvard, Illinois 1896-1899
James Washington Logue (1863–1925), American politician
Jarm Logue (1813-1872), African-American clergyman and abolitionist
Jay Logue, Chief of the Nevada Capitol Police 2010-2012
Jim Logue, American golf club professional and PGA Cup participant 1974, 1982, 1983
Jim Logue, early promoter of Ryū-te martial arts in the United States
Jimmy Logue (1837-1899), American criminal
Joan Logue (born 1942), American video artist
John Logue, IMCA Super Nationals winner 1995, 1998, 1999, 2001, 2003
John Logue, American director of multiple episodes of The PJs animated sitcom
John Logue, co-author of In The Arena with Pat Dye
John G. Logue, American lawyer, owner of Logue House
John J. Logue, American politician
John R. Logue, American writer of The Deadly Hillbillies
Jordan Logue, production engineer on MercyMe, It's Christmas! album
Joseph Logue, principal in the United States v. Joseph Logue PTSD case
Joseph Logue De La Cour (1894-1967), American politician
Josh Logue, Australian director of Empire of the Sun  and other videos
Julian Logue, Irish professional snooker player, Northern Ireland Amateur Championship winner 1995
Julie Logue (born 1971), Irish cricketer
Karina Logue, Canadian actress in NCIS: Los Angeles (season 8) and other productions, sister of Donal Logue
Kerry Logue, American 420 dinghy sailor, North American club champion 2000
Kyle D. Logue, American law professor
Larry M. Logue, American historian, co-author of The Civil War Soldier: A Historical Reader and other works
Lionel Logue (1880–1953), Australian speech therapist
Louis Logue Armét (1914-1981), American architect
Major Logue (1826-1900), Western Australia politician
Mark Logue, British co-author of The King's Speech: How One Man Saved the British Monarchy
Mark Logue, English footballer for Parishes of Jersey football team
Mary Logue, American author of Sleep Like a Tiger, wife of Pete Hautman
Matt Logue, American animator for The Chronicles of Narnia: The Lion, the Witch and the Wardrobe
Maurice Logue, Irish rugby coach for Tullow RFC
Michael Logue (1840–1924), Irish prelate of the Roman Catholic Church
Michael Logue, five-time Australian Quiz Championship winner
Mike Logue, American businessman
Niall Logue (born 1985), Northern Irish footballer
Patricia Logue, Londonderry city councillor 2019
Paul Logue, writer for the Scottish crime drama series Shetland
Penellope "Penny" Logue, founder of the Tenacious Unicorn Ranch
Pete Logue, member of the K&A Gang
Dr. R. Bruce Logue, co-editor of Hurst's the Heart medical textbook
Rachel Logue, American voice artist on the Japanese manga series Btooom!
Ronald Logue, American businessman
Ronnie Logue, member of The Gap band
Rory Logue, British member of the FaZe Clan entertainment organization
Rose Logue, Clarion, Pennsylvania borough council member 
Sarah E. Logue, American Internet radio host known professionally as Sarah X Dylan
Shawn Logue, American film editor on Mosaic
Stephen Logue, American video game producer of DragoniaSuzette Logue, American Boston Ballet II dancer
Thomas Logue, Chief Judge for the Florida Third District Court of Appeal, appointed 2012
Thomas A. Logue, American politician
Zach Logue, American professional baseball player

 See also 

 Characters 
Logue, character in 1993 science fiction novel FluxAstra Logue and Alex Logue, characters in Hellblazer mythos
Brilburn Logue, pseudonym used by Alan Moore
Marcus Logue, character on 2008-2013 British television series Being HumanMeredith Logue, character in 1955 novel The Talented Mr. Ripley Places 
Logue, town in Burkino Faso
Logue Brook, Western Australia
Logue Brook Dam, Western Australia
Logue's Brewery, Adelaide
Logue House, Houston
Logue Library, Chestnut Hill College

 Other 
Drama-Logue Award, American theater awardDreamy-Logue, 2000 mini-album by Japanese group DialogueOne Piece: Logue Town Chapter, 2000 novel by Eiichiro Oda
Lake Logue wattle (Acacia vittata), Australian plantLogue, 2009 short film by Hitoshi KumataniLogue, Inc., 2009 short film by Max BenatorLoveleigh's Logue, play by Canadian writer Wendy Motion Brathwaite
Okta Logue, German rock bandThe Marijuana-Logues'', 2004 off-Broadway play

References 

